The Maryland Coastal Bays Program (MCBP) is one of the 28 United States National Estuary Programs created in the 1987 Amendments to the Clean Water Act. The program, organized by the United States Environmental Protection Agency, is a non-regulatory federal-state-local collaboration working to restore water quality and conserve the natural resources of the bay system adjacent to Ocean City, Maryland and Assateague Island. The partnership works with municipalities, non-profits, governmental agencies, and businesses; and helps develop, find funding for, and implement projects and programs aimed at improving the health of the estuary. The partnership either directly implements these projects, or administers and manages grants, holds educational workshops and highlights project results.

The program operates the Maryland Coastal Bays Foundation, a private, non-profit corporation which develops and implements of a Comprehensive Conservation Management Plan for Maryland’s Coastal Bays, and supports conservation and educational activities.

The bays managed under the program are:
 Assawoman Bay
 Chincoteague Bay
 Isle of Wight Bay
 Newport Bay
 Sinepuxent Bay
 St. Martin River.

Water quality
In 2021 the program reported that overall water quality in the bays declined during 2019-2020, mainly associated with decline in seagrass and hard clams. Nutrient pollution in the bays were at moderate levels, and the program continues to monitor for harmful algal blooms (HABs), which are often caused by excess nutrients.

Projects
The program has conducted environmental monitoring of HABs offshore from the bays, focusing on nutrient pollution and occurrences of Dinophysis, Karenia and Pseudo-nitzschia.

In 2021 the program worked with the Maryland Department of Natural Resources to establish a nesting project for Common terns on an artificial island in Chincoteague Bay.

References

Charities based in Maryland
Environmental organizations based in Maryland
Coastal Bays
United States Environmental Protection Agency